Blankenship Hollow is a valley in McDonald County in the U.S. state of Missouri.

Blankenship Hollow has the name of the local Blankenship family.

References

Valleys of McDonald County, Missouri
Valleys of Missouri